The following is a list of French liqueurs and spirits that are entitled to use the designation Appellation d'Origine Contrôlée (AOC) on their label.

The majority are brandies and eaux-de-vie forming part of the Cognac and Armagnac appellations. Additional appellations cover apple-based cider, pommeau and Calvados, and the rums of Martinique.

See also List of Appellation d'Origine Contrôlée wines.

Appellations